is a Japanese josei manga magazine published by Shueisha since May 28, 1994. 

Originally the magazine's name was Chorus, but it changed to Cocohana with the January 2012 issue. Cocohana is published monthly on the 28th.

Manga

Current 
:

Kyaria Kogitsune Kin no Machi
Higepiyo
Chikutaku Bonbon
Caramel, Cinnamon, Popcorn
Yottsu no Kisetsu
Manpukuji
Tanin Kurashi
Papa Told Me
Mama wa Tenparist
Seigi no Mikata
Heavenly Kiss
Kishuku no Niwa
Moment: Eien no Isshun

Former 
Clover (Toriko Chiya)
Clover Trèfle (Toriko Chiya)
Honey and Clover (Chica Umino)
Blank Canvas: My So-Called Artist's Journey (Akiko Higashimura)
Kodomo Nanka Daikirai (Kimidori Inoue)

 (Mari Ozawa)
 (Yukari Ichijo)
 (Yoshizumi Wataru)

 (Mari Ozawa)
 (Aya Nakahara)
 (Momoko Aikawa)
Shōjo Manga (Naoko Matsuda)
Suna no Shiru (Yukari Ichijo)
 (Mieko Ōsaka)
 (Setona Mizushiro)

See also
Young You
You

References

External links
Official website 

1994 establishments in Japan
Josei manga magazines
Magazines established in 1994
Magazines published in Tokyo
Monthly manga magazines published in Japan
Shueisha magazines